This is a list of electoral results for the Electoral district of Broadmeadows in Victorian state elections.

Members for Broadmeadows

Election results

Elections in the 2020s

Elections in the 2010s

Elections in the 2000s

Elections in the 1990s

 Preferences were not distributed in this by-election.

Elections in the 1980s 

 The two party preferred vote was not counted between the Labor and Independent candidates for Broadmeadows.

 The two candidate preferred vote was not counted between the Labor and Democrat candidates for Broadmeadows.

Elections in the 1970s

Elections in the 1960s

 Preferences were not distributed.

Elections in the 1950s

References

 

Victoria (Australia) state electoral results by district